Ann Marie McGlynn (born 22 February 1980) is an Irish long-distance runner. In 2020, she competed in the women's half marathon at the 2020 World Athletics Half Marathon Championships held in Gdynia, Poland.

Notes

References

External links 
 

Living people
1980 births
Place of birth missing (living people)
Irish female long-distance runners
Irish female marathon runners